The 6th Nunavut Legislature  began after the 2021 general election on October 25. The election returned 22 non-partisan members.

Premier and cabinet
After the election, the Legislative Assembly of Nunavut met to select the new premier, P. J. Akeeagok, and cabinet.

Members

Notes
  After recount
  Acclaimed

References

External links
 

6
Legislature, 6
2021 in Canadian politics